Leng Tche can refer to:

 Slow slicing, a form of torture
 Leng Tch'e, a Belgian grindcore band
 Leng Tch'e (album), an album by Naked City
 Lingzhi mushroom, a Chinese medicinal mushroom